The following article lists the cities and metropolitan areas with the greatest scientific output, according to the Nature Index. The Nature Index attempts to objectively measure the scientific output of institutions, cities and countries by the amount of scientific articles and papers published in leading journals. Differences in quality are taken into account. Only articles published in 82 selected quality journals are counted. These journals were selected by an independent committee. If authors from several institutions from different cities are involved in a scientific article, it is divided accordingly, assuming that all researchers were equally involved in the article.

In 2019, Beijing was the city in the world with the largest scientific output, accounting for 2.8% of the world's total. New York City was second in the world, with about 2% of the world’s total. Overall, the United States has the most cities in the top 100 list, followed by China.

List 
The top 100 cities and metropolitan areas with the highest share of articles published in scientific journals in 2020 according to the Nature Index 2021 Science Cities.

Leading cities in different fields 
The 10 cities and metropolitan areas with the highest share of articles published in the fields of life sciences, Earth & environmental sciences, chemistry and physical sciences.

Notes

References 

Lists of cities
Science-related lists